Benjamin Platt Carpenter (May 14, 1837 – December 24, 1921) was an American lawyer and politician from New York and Montana. He was governor of the Montana Territory from 1884 to 1885.

Biography
Carpenter was born in Stanford, Dutchess County, New York. He graduated from Union College in 1857, and studied law. He was admitted to the bar and practiced in Poughkeepsie, New York. On November 24, 1860, he married Esther Thorn, and they had three children.

Carpenter was District Attorney of Dutchess County from 1864 to 1869; a delegate to the New York State Constitutional Convention of 1867-68; a delegate to the 1868 and 1884 Republican National Conventions; a member of the New York State Senate (11th D.) in 1876 and 1877; and Judge of the Dutchess County Court from 1878 to 1882.

At the New York state election, 1882, he ran for Lieutenant Governor of New York on the Republican ticket with Charles J. Folger, but they were heavily defeated by Democrats Grover Cleveland and David B. Hill.

In December 1884, he was appointed by President Chester A. Arthur as Governor of the Montana Territory, and on December 31, 1884, he left Poughkeepsie for Helena, Montana. After a short tenure, he was removed from office by the new Democratic President, Grover Cleveland, but he stayed in Montana, and was a delegate to the Montana State Constitutional Convention of 1889.

On December 24, 1921, Carpenter died in Chula Vista, San Diego County, California.  He was buried at Poughkeepsie Rural Cemetery.

His brother Jacob B. Carpenter (1826–1894) was Mayor of Poughkeepsie in 1875.

Sources
Jacob B. Carpenter His brother's obit in NYT on April 10, 1894
The Bockée Family (Boucquet) 1641-1897 by Martha Bockée Flint (page 93)
MONTANA TAKE WARNING; DON'T MAKE B. PLATT CARPENTER A SENATOR in NYT on December 4, 1889 (recalling the story of the 1882 New York state nominations)

1837 births
1921 deaths
Politicians from Poughkeepsie, New York
Governors of Montana Territory
Republican Party New York (state) state senators
Union College (New York) alumni
Politicians from Helena, Montana
County district attorneys in New York (state)
New York (state) state court judges
People from Chula Vista, California
Montana Republicans